Vladimir Yelagin (born 20 April 1955) is a Russian politician, who served as governor and state minister without portfolio.

Early life
Yelagin was born on 20 April 1955.

Career
Yalegin is the former leader of Our Home Is Russia party. He worked as a construction official. He also served as the governor of Orenburg. He was appointed to the post in October 1991 and won the election to the post on 17 December 1995. His tenure lasted until 1999.

He was appointed federal state minister for social and economic development of the republic of Chechnya on 28 November 2000. The office was established on the same date by president Vladimir Putin. In a cabinet reshuffle in Fall 2002, Yelagin was succeeded by Stanislav Ilyasov in the post. Yelagin was appointed minister without portfolio in the same reshuffle to the cabinet led by Mikhail Kasyanov.

After leaving cabinet post Yelagin became the chairman of the Jurby WaterTech International's supervisory board.

References

External links

20th-century Russian politicians
1955 births
Communist Party of the Soviet Union members
Government ministers of Russia
Governors of Orenburg Oblast
Living people
Members of the Federation Council of Russia (1994–1996)
Members of the Federation Council of Russia (1996–2000)
Our Home – Russia politicians